Ali Taysir is a Yemeni politician. He quit his position as undersecretary at the Human Rights Ministry over the 2011 Yemeni uprising.

References

Yemeni politicians
Living people
Year of birth missing (living people)
Place of birth missing (living people)